Below is a selected list of Narcissus species, varieties and cultivars which currently (2020)
hold the Royal Horticultural Society's Award of Garden Merit (AGM). Narcissus (daffodils) are bulbous perennials which are usually planted as dormant bulbs in autumn (fall) to flower the following spring. Once established they flower reliably every year, with variously trumpet-shaped flowers in a range of colours, mostly shades of white and yellow. The central trumpet (corona) and the outer 'petals' (perianth segments) often have contrasting colours. Breeders have produced a huge range of sizes and shapes in these flowers, which are among the most popular of all plants in cultivation.

Divisions

Plants are grouped by the RHS into 13 divisions, each describing a particular growth habit and flower shape. All are of garden origin except group 13. 

 Trumpet Daffodil cultivars: solitary flower with corona (trumpet) longer than perianth (outer petals)
 Large-cupped Daffodil cultivars: corona shorter than perianth
 Small-cupped Daffodil cultivars: corona less than ⅓ of the length of the perianth
 Double flowered Daffodil cultivars
 Triandrus Daffodil cultivars: reflexed perianth, short corona
 Cyclamineus Daffodil cultivars: angled flowers, reflexed perianth, long corona
 Jonquilla and Apodanthus Daffodil cultivars: scented, late-flowering, shallow cupped
 Tazetta Daffodil cultivars: multiple flowers, scented, autumn-spring flowering
 Poeticus Daffodil cultivars: scented, white perianth, small corona
 Bulbocodium Daffodil cultivars: large corona, small perianth
 (a) Split-corona Daffodil cultivars: Collar (b) Split-corona: Papillon
 Other Daffodil cultivars
 Daffodils distinguished solely by botanical name: all wild Narcissus species (including hybrids distinguished solely by botanical name)

The main flowering season is late February and March in the Northern Hemisphere. Early daffodils appear from November through early February, while late varieties may appear in April, depending on the weather.

Narcissus species & cultivars
The AGM citation includes a hardiness rating: most of the narcissi listed here are rated H6 (-20 °C to -15 °C [-4 °F to 5 °F]), but some are H4 (-10 °C to -5 °C [14 °F to 23 °F]). These are indicated in brackets next to the name. Dimensions shown are all maximum heights; heights may vary according to climatic conditions. The notes show whether the flowers are double or scented, also links to the names' sources

References

Narcissus
Narcissus (plant)